Hair Show is a 2004 comedy film directed by Leslie Small starring Mo'Nique and Kellita Smith. It is the theatrical directorial debut of Leslie Small.

Plot
Peaches (Mo'Nique), a hair stylist from Baltimore, and her estranged sister, Angela (Kellita Smith), the owner of an upscale salon in Beverly Hills, get reacquainted when Peaches decides to attend a celebration for Angela in Los Angeles. The reunion is bittersweet and worsens when Angela finds out that Peaches is on the run from the IRS and only has 60 days to pay $50,000 in back taxes. After some hilarious moments and passionate exchanges, the two sisters join forces to fight off a pesky rival salon owner Marcella (Gina Torres) and save Peaches from her troubles by competing for a lucrative cash prize and bragging rights at the city's annual hair show.

Cast
Mo'Nique as Patricia "Peaches" Whittaker
Kellita Smith as Angela "Angelle" Whittaker 
Gina Torres as Marcella
David Ramsey as Cliff
Taraji P. Henson as Tiffany
Keiko Agena as Jun Ni
Cee Cee Michaela as Simone
Joe Torry as Brian
Andre B. Blake as Gianni
Bryce Wilson as Drake
Vivica A. Fox as herself
Tommy "Tiny" Lister Jr. as Agent Little
Tom Virtue as Agent Scott
Reagan Gomez-Preston as Fiona
James Avery as Seymour Gold

Reception
The movie was a box office failure, grossing just $305,281.

Nominations
2005 BET Comedy Awards
Outstanding Directing for a Theatrical Film — Leslie Small
Outstanding Lead Actress in a Theatrical Film — Mo'Nique
Outstanding Writing for a Theatrical Film — Andrea Allen-Wiley, Devon Watkins, Sherri A. McGee

References

External links

2004 films
2004 comedy films
2004 directorial debut films
African-American comedy films
Films directed by Leslie Small
Films set in Los Angeles
2000s English-language films
2000s American films